Stefan Zisser (March 26, 1980 in Bolzano, Italy) is an Italian former professional ice hockey Forward. He most prominently played with HCB South Tyrol of the Austrian Erste Bank Eishockey Liga (EBEL).

Zisser was a veteran member of the Italy men's national ice hockey team who has participated at several Ice Hockey World Championships. He also competed for Italy in ice hockey at the 2006 Winter Olympics.

References

External links

1980 births
Bolzano HC players
Germanophone Italian people
Ice hockey players at the 2006 Winter Olympics
Italian ice hockey centres
Living people
Olympic ice hockey players of Italy
Ice hockey people from Bolzano